E 421 is a European B class road in Belgium and Luxembourg, connecting the cities Eynatten - Eupen - St. Vith - Luxembourg City

Eynatten, Eupen, St. Vith

Luxembourg City

External links 
 UN Economic Commission for Europe: Overall Map of E-road Network (2007)

International E-road network
Roads in Belgium
Roads in Luxembourg